The 2001–02 Illinois Fighting Illini men's basketball team represented the University of Illinois.

Regular season
In 2002, the Illini earned a four-way share of the Big Ten title before advancing to the Sweet Sixteen of the NCAA tournament.  Frank Williams again earned first-team All-Big Ten honors as the five seniors
who finished their careers took the Illini from an 11th-place finish in the league in 1999 to consecutive Big Ten titles in 2001 and 2002.

Roster

Schedule
												
Source							

									
												

|-
!colspan=12 style="background:#DF4E38; color:white;"| Non-Conference regular season

	

|-
!colspan=9 style="background:#DF4E38; color:#FFFFFF;"|Big Ten regular season

|-
!colspan=9 style="text-align: center; background:#DF4E38"|Big Ten tournament

|-			
!colspan=9 style="text-align: center; background:#DF4E38"|NCAA tournament

|-

Season Statistics

NCAA basketball tournament
Midwest regional
 Illinois 93, San Diego State 64
 Illinois 72, Creighton 60
Regional semifinal
Kansas 73, Illinois 69

Awards and honors
Frank Williams
Associated Press All-American honorable mention
Team Most Valuable Player 
Fighting Illini All-Century team (2005)
Brian Cook
Fighting Illini All-Century team (2005)

Team players drafted into the NBA

Rankings

References

Illinois Fighting Illini
Illinois
Illinois Fighting Illini men's basketball seasons
2001 in sports in Illinois
2002 in sports in Illinois